Burlington/Hamilton Harbour Water Aerodrome  is located at Hamilton Harbour on Lake Ontario,  southwest of Burlington, Ontario. Canada.

See also
 Burlington Executive Airport

References

Registered aerodromes in Ontario
Seaplane bases in Ontario
Transport in Burlington, Ontario